Columbina is a stock character and Harlequin's mistress

Columbina may also refer to:

 Columbina (bird), a genus of dove
 Columbina Rural Service Center (or Columbina Township), Zhombe, Kwekwe, Midlands, Zimbabwe; a township
 Flora (Francesco Melzi) also called La Columbina; a 1520 painting by Francesco Melzi

See also

 
 Colombina (disambiguation)
 Colombine (disambiguation)
 Colombian (disambiguation) 
 Colombiana (disambiguation) 
 Colombia (disambiguation) 
 Columbine (disambiguation) 
 Columbian (disambiguation) 
 Columbiana (disambiguation) 
 Columbia (disambiguation) 
 Columbiad (disambiguation)